The Charlotte metropolitan area, sometimes referred to as Metrolina, is a metropolitan area of the U.S. states of North and South Carolina, within and surrounding the city of Charlotte. The metropolitan area also includes the cities of Gastonia, Concord, Huntersville, and Rock Hill as well as the large suburban area in the counties surrounding Mecklenburg County, which is at the center of the metro area. Located in the Piedmont, it is the largest metropolitan area in the Carolinas, and the fourth largest in the Southeastern United States. The Charlotte metropolitan area is one of the fastest growing metropolitan areas in the United States.

There are two official metropolitan boundaries for the Charlotte metropolitan area: the Charlotte-Concord-Gastonia Metropolitan Statistical Area (MSA) and the Charlotte-Concord Combined Statistical Area (CSA). The two regions are identical except for the addition of two micropolitan areas, Shelby and Albemarle to the Charlotte-Concord CSA that are not included in the Charlotte-Concord-Gastonia MSA. The population of the MSA was 2,595,027 and the population of the CSA was 2,754,842 as of 2020 Census.

The Charlotte metro area is a major financial center, transportation hub, and entertainment destination. Charlotte is the second largest financial hub in the United States behind New York City, being the headquarters for Bank of America and Truist Financial as well as housing the East Coast headquarters and largest employment hub of Wells Fargo. Other Fortune 500 companies headquartered in the metro area include Brighthouse Financial, Duke Energy, Honeywell, Lowe's, and Nucor. The Charlotte metro area is the largest manufacturing region in the Carolinas. The estimated gross metropolitan product (GMP) of the metro area is over $170 billion. Located in Mecklenburg County, Charlotte Douglas International Airport is the sixth-largest airport in the world by aircraft movements and the city's location at the junction of I-85 and I-77 makes it a highway logistics center. The Charlotte metro is also one of the centers of American auto racing and is home to the Carolina Panthers, Charlotte Hornets, and Charlotte FC.

The Charlotte metro is home to a number of prominent higher education institutions, including the University of North Carolina at Charlotte, Queens University of Charlotte, Davidson College, Belmont Abbey College, and many more. The primary community college for the area is Central Piedmont Community College, which has several campuses throughout Charlotte and the surrounding region.

Nicknames and regional identity 
The regional area around the city was at one time called Metrolina, a portmanteau of Metropolis and Carolina. The term has fallen out of widespread general use, though it still maintains a presence and is used by the North Carolina Department of Transportation. The term does retain a marketing value, and is thus also used by many businesses in the area.  Metrolina refers to the region that includes the cities of Charlotte, Concord, Gastonia and Rock Hill. The name Metrolina came into fashion when North Carolina's other two large metropolitan areas took on nicknames—the Triangle for Raleigh/Durham/Cary/Chapel Hill and the Triad for Greensboro/Winston-Salem/High Point. (The Triad now goes by the name Piedmont Triad to distinguish it from other tri-cities.)

Charlotte's most common nickname is the Queen City, often abbreviated as Q.C., a name derived from the city's namesake, Queen Charlotte of Mecklenburg-Strelitz.

The term "Charlotte USA" referred to the 16-county region, which includes 12 counties in North Carolina and 4 counties in South Carolina. The term was championed during a marketing campaign by the Charlotte Regional Partnership, a non-profit organization made up of both private- and public-sector members from throughout the Charlotte region. This organization represents one of seven officially designated economic development regions in North Carolina.

Region J of the North Carolina Councils of Government, of which a majority of the Charlotte area municipalities and counties belong, uses the term Centralina in its body's name, Centralina Council of Governments. This term, however, is used only sparingly among locals.

Geography

Counties 
The official Charlotte metropolitan area includes the Charlotte–Concord–Gastonia MSA (Anson, Cabarrus, Gaston, Iredell, Lincoln, Mecklenburg, Rowan, and Union counties in North Carolina; Chester, Lancaster and York counties in South Carolina). The Charlotte CSA includes all the MSA counties along with the following micropolitan areas in North Carolina:  Albemarle (Stanly County) and Shelby (Cleveland County). (Census Bureau definition for CSA)

The Charlotte Regional Partnership also identifies three additional counties to the what they refer to as the "Charlotte Region"—Alexander and Catawba counties in North Carolina, and Chesterfield County, South Carolina. Catawba and Alexander counties are currently part of the Hickory–Lenoir–Morganton Metropolitan Statistical Area or "the Unifour". Factoring in the Unifour, as well as Chesterfield County, if one considers these regions to be part of the Charlotte area, as many in the area regard them as such, the population according to 2018 Census estimates, increases to 3,190,390. If this population was officially used, the Charlotte Area would become the 20th largest CSA, overtaking the St. Louis, Missouri area, and placing it behind Portland, Oregon.

Largest cities and towns

Cities and Towns: 5,000 to 10,000 in Population

Suburban towns and cities under 5,000 in population

Unincorporated communities 

Changes in house prices for the area are publicly tracked on a regular basis using the Case–Shiller index; the statistic is published by Standard & Poor's and is also a component of the S&P 20-city composite index of the value of the U.S. residential real estate market.

Transportation

Mass transit 
The Charlotte Area Transit System (CATS) is the mass  transit agency that operates local, express, bus rapid services that serves Charlotte and its immediate suburban communities in both North and South Carolina. CATS also operates light rail and streetcar lines. CATS is also building a commuter, light rail, streetcar network as a supplement to its established bus transit throughout the region. The LYNX Blue Line runs from Interstate 485, through SouthEnd, Uptown Charlotte, to the University of North Carolina at Charlotte. Plans are for it to stretch initially to Mooresville, Pineville, and Matthews.  Charlotte-Douglas International Airport will be connected to the system by light rail.

Gastonia Transit, Concord Kannapolis Area Transit, My Ride Transit in Rock Hill, Western Piedmont Regional Transit Authority in Hickory, Salisbury Transit, and Iredell Area Transit System in Iredell County also provide fixed route bus services within the Greater Charlotte metropolitan region as well.

Roads 
The Charlotte region is also served by 2 major interstate highways (I-85 and I-77), and their 2 spurs (I-277, and I-485). I-40 also passes through the center of Iredell County, which is the northern region of the Charlotte metro. Other major freeways include Independence Boulevard (east Charlotte to I-277), a portion of US 321 between Hickory and Gastonia, and Monroe Connector / Bypass, each projected to cost over $1 billion per project.

Other important US highways in the region include:  US 74 (east to Wilmington, west to Asheville and Chattanooga), US 52 (through the far eastern part of the region), US 321 (through Chester, York, Gastonia, Dallas, Lincolnton and Hickory), US 601 (passing east of Charlotte) and US 70 (through Salisbury, Statesville and Hickory).

Primary state routes include NC/SC 49, NC 16 (which extends north to West Virginia), NC 73, NC 150, NC 18, NC 24, NC 27, SC 9 and SC 5.

Air 
Charlotte Douglas International Airport is the main airport in the Charlotte area and the 6th busiest in the country. In April 2007, Charlotte was the fastest growing airport in the US. The airport went on to surpass its sister US Airways hub in Philadelphia, Pennsylvania as one of the 30 busiest airports in the world in terms of passenger traffic. A new terminal to the northwest of the center of the airport will be built in the near future, possibly as a Caribbean/Latin America international terminal. CLT is also supplemented by regional airports in Concord, Gastonia, Hickory, Monroe, Statesville, in North Carolina, as well as Rock Hill in South Carolina.

Higher education

Four-year institutions 
North Carolina

Barber–Scotia College
Belmont Abbey College
Carolinas College of Health Sciences
Catawba College
Davidson College
Gardner–Webb University
Appalachian Center at Hickory
Johnson & Wales University
Johnson C. Smith University

Lenoir-Rhyne University
Livingstone College
Montreat College
Pfeiffer University
Queens University of Charlotte
Strayer University
University of North Carolina at Charlotte
Wingate University

South Carolina
Clinton College
Winthrop University
University of South Carolina-Lancaster

Two-year institutions 
North Carolina

Catawba Valley Community College
Central Piedmont Community College
Cleveland Community College
Gaston College

Mitchell Community College
Rowan–Cabarrus Community College
South Piedmont Community College
Stanly Community College

South Carolina
York Technical College

Defunct institutions 
Charlotte School of Law (2006–2017, private for-profit law school)
King's College (1901–2018, private for-profit two-year college)

Healthcare
 Hospitals of the Atrium Health system
Carolinas Medical Center (Charlotte)
Levine Children's Hospital (Charlotte)
Carolinas Medical Center-Mercy (Charlotte)
Atrium Health Cabarrus (Concord)
Atrium Health Pineville (Pineville)
Atrium Health University City (Charlotte)
Atrium Health Union (Monroe)
Atrium Health Kings Mountain (Kings Mountain)
 Hospitals of the Novant Health system
Novant Health Presbyterian Medical Center (Charlotte)
Novant Health Hemby Children's Hospital (Charlotte)
Novant Health Rowan Medical Center (Salisbury)
Novant Health Charlotte Orthopedic Hospital (Charlotte)
Novant Health Matthews Medical Center (Matthews)
Novant Health Mint Hill Medical Center (Mint Hill)
Novant Health Huntersville Medical Center (Huntersville)
 Other hospitals
CaroMont Regional Medical Center (Gastonia)
Lake Norman Regional Medical Center (Mooresville)
Piedmont Medical Center (Rock Hill)

Attractions

Nature and geography 
The foothills of the Blue Ridge Mountains begin along the western edge of the region; the descent (the Fall Line) to the coastal plain begins along the eastern edge. Amid this varied topography, the Daniel Stowe Botanical Garden and several state parks (Morrow Mountain, Crowders Mountain, South Mountains, Duke Power, Landsford Canal, Andrew Jackson) offer recreational possibilities, along with the Uwharrie National Forest just east and northeast of Albemarle, and the Sumter National Forest at the southwest corner of the area.  Kings Mountain National Military Park is partially located in York County and in Cherokee County near Blacksburg, South Carolina.

Cultural attractions 

Attractions in Charlotte include the Harvey B. Gantt Center for African-American Arts + Cultural, Carowinds theme park, Discovery Place, Spirit Square, NASCAR Hall of Fame, the North Carolina Blumenthal Performing Arts Center, Children's Theatre of Charlotte, Actor's Theatre of Charlotte, Carolina Actors Studio Theatre, Theatre Charlotte, the Charlotte Museum of History, Levine Museum of the New South, the McGill Rose Garden, and the Wing Haven Gardens. The Bechtler Museum of Modern Art and the Mint Museum in Uptown Charlotte are expanding the art venues in Charlotte.

Other places of interest in the surrounding area include the Schiele Museum (in Gastonia), Charlotte Motor Speedway (in Concord), the Carolina Raptor Center (in Huntersville), Daniel Stowe Botanical Garden (in Belmont), Latta Plantation (in Huntersville), Brattonsville Historic District (in McConnells), the North Carolina Transportation Museum (in Spencer), Fort Dobbs historical site (in Statesville), Catawba County Firefighters Museum (in Conover), the Arts & Science Center of Catawba Valley/Millholland Planetarium (in Hickory) the Museum of York County (in Rock Hill), James K. Polk historical site (in Pineville), the Catawba Cultural Center (in York County), the Museum of the Waxhaws (in Waxhaw), Glencairn Gardens (in Rock Hill), and the Reed Gold Mine (in Locust).

Entertainment 
The PNC Music Pavilion is located in the University City area of Charlotte. The performing arts amphitheatre has hosted many popular music concerts.                                                                               The U.S. National Whitewater Center (USNWC) is the world's premier outdoor recreation and environmental education center. Alongside mountain-biking and running trails, a climbing center, and challenge course, the park's unique feature is a multiple-channel, customized whitewater river for rafting and canoe/kayak enthusiasts of all abilities.

Olympic-caliber athletes, weekend warriors and casual observers share this world-class sports and training center.

Inspired by the successful Penrith Whitewater Stadium built for the 2000 Olympics and the stadium built for the 2004 Athens Games, the USNWC is the world's largest multi-channel recirculating whitewater river. The USOC has designated the USNWC an official Olympic Training Site.

Shopping 
SouthPark Mall is one of the Southern United States' most upscale malls, including stores such as Louis Vuitton, Tiffany & Co., Burberry, Hermès, Neiman Marcus, and American Girl. SouthPark mall is also the largest mall in the Carolinas and one of the most-profitable malls in the United States.

Other large regional-scale Shopping malls include Northlake Mall, Carolina Place Mall,  Concord Mills, Charlotte Premium Outlets, Phillips Place (across from SouthPark), RiverGate, Westfield Eastridge, Rock Hill Galleria, Plaza Fiesta, Carolina Mall, Monroe Crossing Mall, Signal Hill Mall, and Valley Hills Mall.

Concord Mills is unique in that it does not feature the typical anchor stores found at other malls; it focuses more on attracting outlet store tenants. The mall is visited by over 15 million annually.

Alongside enclosed malls and strip centers are several other shopping districts.  Several downtowns can claim an abundance of shopping options, along with restaurants and other entertainment, and a few other specific districts have emerged:  Central Avenue, especially in the Plaza-Midwood area; the NoDa area of North Charlotte; and the Arboretum in southeast Charlotte (geographically, south), to offer a handful of examples.  Several of these areas are at the center of the area's growing immigrant business communities.

Sports 

In addition to Charlotte Motor Speedway, there are plenty of other sports venues, including Truist Field (home of the Charlotte Knights, the Triple-A affiliate of the Chicago White Sox), Bank of America Stadium (home of the NFL's Carolina Panthers and MLS's Charlotte FC), Spectrum Center (home of the NBA's Charlotte Hornets) and Bojangles' Coliseum (home of American Hockey League's Charlotte Checkers). The Charlotte Eagles of the United Soccer Leagues call the area home, and the Kannapolis Intimidators and Hickory Crawdads are Single-A Minor-League Baseball teams located in this region.

Economy 
 

Companies with headquarters in the region include Bank of America, Belk, BellSouth Telecommunications, Bojangles', The Compass Group, Carolina Beverage Corporation Inc. (makers of Sun Drop and Cheerwine), Duke Energy, Family Dollar, Food Lion, Harris Teeter, Lance, Inc, LendingTree, Lowe's, Meineke Car Care Centers, Muzak, Nucor, Chiquita Brands International Transbotics, Royal & SunAlliance (USA), SPX Corporation, Time Warner Cable (a business unit of Fortune 500 company Time Warner), and Wells Fargo.

Charlotte has gained fame as the second largest banking and finance center in the U.S., and the area's orientation towards emerging industries is seen in the success of the University Research Park (the 7th largest research park in the country) and the redevelopment of part of the Pillowtex site in Kannapolis as a biotech research facility featuring the participation of University of North Carolina at Charlotte, University of North Carolina at Chapel Hill, Duke University and North Carolina State University.

Reflections Studios in Charlotte played an important role in the emergent late-20th-century American musical underground – R.E.M., Pylon, Let's Active, Don Dixon and Charlotte's Fetchin Bones (among many others) all recorded influential and acclaimed albums there.  Charlotte-based Ripete and Surfside Records maintain important catalogs of regional soul and beach music, and the area has also played a role in the history of gospel, bluegrass and country music. The Milestone, one of the first punk clubs in the South, is located in west Charlotte, and in the past hosted legendary appearances from the likes of R.E.M., Black Flag, Nirvana, The Minutemen, D.O.A., Bad Brains, Charlotte's Antiseen, and many others.

Notable residents 
Notable people from the Charlotte metro area include:
 Artists – Romare Bearden
 Astronauts – Charles Duke and Susan Helms
 Religious figures – Billy Graham and Steven Furtick
 Musicians – Earl Scruggs, Dababy, George Clinton, Fred Durst, Prairie Prince, Blind Boy Fuller, The Avett Brothers, and Randy Travis
 Independent filmmakers – Tim Kirkman and Ross McElwee
 Actors – Randolph Scott, Dwayne Johnson, Nick Cannon,  Chyler Leigh, Lauren Holt and Berlinda Tolbert 
 Media – Jim Nantz
 Politicians – Sue Myrick, Harvey Gantt, Elizabeth Dole, Mick Mulvaney,  Jesse Helms; U.S. presidents Andrew Jackson and James K. Polk
 Professional wrestlers – Ric Flair, Charlotte Flair, Tessa Blanchard, Cedric Alexander, Cody Rhodes and R-Truth
 NASCAR drivers – Dale Earnhardt, Dale Earnhardt Jr. and William Byron
 Professional athletes – Stephen Curry, Seth Curry, Kyle Seager, Corey Seager, Hakeem Nicks, Daniel Jones, Chris Canty, Dwight Clark, Luke Maye, Stephon Gilmore, Ish Smith, Hoyt Wilhelm, Kennedy Meeks, Benjamin Watson, Cordarrelle Patterson, Rayjon Tucker, Jadeveon Clowney,  Wendell Moore Jr., Jaden Springer, Patrick Williams, Grant Williams, Devon Dotson, Hassan Whiteside and James Worthy
 R&B singers – Anthony Hamilton, Calvin Richardson,  Stephanie Mills and K-Ci & JoJo of Jodeci
 Writers – Carson McCullers and Ayesha Curry

Government 
A majority of the municipalities and counties in the North Carolina parts of the Charlotte metropolitan area belong to the Centralina Council of Governments. Cleveland County belongs to the Isothermal Planning and Development Commission and Alexander and Catawba counties belong to the Western Piedmont Council of Governments.

See also 
Catawba Nuclear Station
Interstate 85
Piedmont Atlantic Megaregion
Piedmont Crescent
Upstate South Carolina

References

External links 

Charlotte Chamber of Commerce
Charlotte USA – The Charlotte Regional Partnership

 
Economy of North Carolina
Regions of North Carolina
Metropolitan areas of North Carolina